Juniperus turbinata is a woody plant in the family Cupressaceae. The species was previously treated as part of Juniperus phoenicea, which is now regarded as restricted to Spain and France, whereas J. turbinata is found from Macaronesia throughout the Mediterranean to the Arabian Peninsula.

Description
Juniperus turbinata resembles J. phoenicea. The smaller branches have reddish bark. The adult leaves are scale-like, closely pressed to the twigs. Pollen is produced in the autumn (October to November), rather than in spring as in J. phoenicea. Each cone typically has 7–9 seeds (fewer than J. phoenicea).

Taxonomy
J. turbinata was first described by Giovanni Gussone in 1844. It has been treated as a variety or subspecies of J. phoenicea. Plants occurring in the Canary Islands have been treated as the separate species J. canariensis. DNA from populations previously assigned to J. phoenicea var. phoenicea and J. phoenicea var. turbinata was studied, and the results were published in 2013. It was found that the two taxa were clearly separated, and hence best treated as two species. No significant difference was found between Canary Island populations and other populations of J. turbinata.

Distribution and habitat
J. turbinata has a native distribution from Macaronesia throughout the Mediterranean to the Arabian Peninsula. It is known from southwestern and southeastern Europe, North Africa, the Canary Islands and Madeira, and parts of western Asia (Cyprus, the east Aegean Islands, Lebanon and Syria, the region of Palestine, the Sinai Peninsula) and northwestern Arabian Peninsula (Saudi Arabia). It favours soils that are composed of sand, Cambrian limestone or volcanic rock.

References

turbinata
Flora of Southwestern Europe
Flora of Southeastern Europe
Flora of North Africa
Flora of the Canary Islands
Flora of Madeira
Flora of Western Asia
Flora of Saudi Arabia
Plants described in 1844